In mathematics, and specifically the field of partial differential equations (PDEs), a parametrix is an approximation to a fundamental solution of a PDE, and is essentially an approximate inverse to a differential operator.

A parametrix for a differential operator is often easier to construct than a fundamental solution, and for many purposes is almost as good. It is sometimes possible to construct a fundamental solution from a parametrix by iteratively improving it.

Overview and informal definition
It is useful to review what a fundamental solution for a differential operator  with constant coefficients is: it is a distribution   on ℝn such that

in the weak sense, where   is the Dirac delta distribution.

In a similar way, a parametrix for a variable coefficient differential operator   is a distribution   such that

where    is some   function with compact support.

The parametrix is a useful concept in the study of elliptic differential operators and, more generally, of hypoelliptic pseudodifferential operators with variable coefficient, since for such operators over appropriate domains a parametrix can be shown to exist, can be somewhat easily constructed and be a smooth function away from the origin.

Having found the analytic expression of the parametrix, it is possible to compute the solution of the associated fairly general elliptic partial differential equation by solving an associated Fredholm integral equation: also, the structure itself of the parametrix reveals properties of the solution of the problem without even calculating it, like its smoothness and other qualitative properties.

Parametrices for pseudodifferential operators
More generally, if   is any pseudodifferential operator of order  , then another pseudodifferential operator   of order   is called a parametrix for   if the operators

are both pseudodifferential operators of negative order.

On a compact manifold, the differences above are compact operators. In this case the original operator   defines a Fredholm operator between the Sobolev spaces.

Hadamard parametrix construction
An explicit construction of a parametrix for second order partial differential operators based on power series developments was discovered by Jacques Hadamard. It can be applied to the  Laplace operator, the wave equation and the heat equation.

In the case of the heat equation or the wave equation, where there is a distinguished time parameter  , 
The constant term is 1 and the higher coefficients are functions determined recursively as integrals in a single variable.

In general, the power series will not converge but will provide only an asymptotic expansion of the exact solution. A suitable truncation of the power series then yields a parametrix.

Construction of a fundamental solution from a parametrix

A sufficiently good parametrix can often be used to construct an exact fundamental solution by a convergent iterative procedure as follows .

If   is an element of a ring with multiplication * such that 

for some approximate right inverse   and "sufficiently small" remainder term   then, at least formally, 

so if the infinite series makes sense then   has a right inverse
.

Notes

References

 .
 .
.
 (in Italian).
 (in Italian).
 

Fourier analysis
Partial differential equations
Schwartz distributions